Louis Jung (18 February 1917 –  22 October 2015) was a French politician who was a Senator and later the President of the Parliamentary Assembly of the Council of Europe.

References

1917 births
2015 deaths
Senators of Bas-Rhin
Recipients of the Order of Merit of Baden-Württemberg